Hutt Lagoon is a marine salt lake located near the Indian Ocean coast  north of the mouth of the Hutt River, in the Mid West region of Western Australia.

Geography
Hutt Lagoon is an elongate lake that sits in a dune swale adjacent to the coast. The town of Gregory is located between the ocean and the lake's southern shores. The road between Northampton and Kalbarri, George Grey Drive, runs along its eastern edge.

Hutt Lagoon comprises most of the Hutt Lagoon System, a DIWA-listed wetland system that also takes in a number of adjacent small lakes, such as Utcha Swamp.

Hydrology
It is separated from the Indian Ocean by a beach barrier ridge and barrier dune system. Similar to Lake MacLeod,  to the north of Carnarvon, Hutt Lagoon is fed by marine waters through the barrier ridge and by meteoric waters through springs.

Due to the salina’s sub-sealevel position, seepage of seawater into the salina is continuous year round. During the winter wet season, the amount of water coming into the salina is substantially increased by the influx of meteoric groundwater. These factors combine to form a setting within which salt is deposited seasonally and the rates and style of precipitation follow a balance between influx of water and removal by evaporation. During the summer about 95% of the salina surface is a dry salt flat.

History
Hutt Lagoon was named by the explorer George Grey who camped on its eastern edge on 4 April 1839, while on his second disastrous expedition along the Western Australian coast. He mistook the wet season lagoon for a large estuary and named "the river and estuary now discovered" after William Hutt, M.P., brother of John Hutt, the second Governor of Western Australia. Hutt was a British Liberal politician who was heavily involved in the colonization of Western Australia, New Zealand and South Australia.

After Grey's arrival back in Perth, Governor Hutt dispatched the colonial schooner Champion under Captain Dring to investigate the large estuary and river discovered. In summer, January 1840, George Fletcher Moore aboard Champion reported the Hutt River at its mouth to be dry, and could not locate the large estuary described by Grey.

Resources

β-carotene 
Hutt Lagoon is a pink lake, a salt lake with a red or pink due to the presence of the carotenoid-producing algae Dunaliella salina, a source of β-carotene, a food-colouring agent and source of vitamin A. The lagoon contains the world's largest microalgae production plant, a  series of artificial ponds used to farm Dunaliella salina.

Brine shrimp 
Hutt Lagoon provides a commercial supply of Artemia parthenogenetica brine shrimp. Artemia is a specialty feed used by prawn and fish farmers and the aquarium fish trade.

Salt and gypsum 
In 1854 the explorer Augustus Charles Gregory promoted the quantity and quality of the salt deposits at Hutt Lagoon and their proximity to Port Gregory. He also commended the gypsum deposits on the western shore of the lagoon.

At the 1873 Sydney Intercolonial Exhibition salt from the Hutt Lagoon deposit was Highly Commended. Hutt Lagoon gypsum received a Bronze Medal. Hutt Lagoon salt was also exhibited at the 1880 Melbourne Exhibition.

In August 1908 Port Gregory Saltworks consigned its first shipment of salt on SS Venus. Production was seasonal, of the order of 4,000 tons per year and employing up to 50, until the salt operation went into liquidation in 1924.

See also

 List of lakes of Western Australia

References

Lakes of the Mid West (Western Australia)
DIWA-listed wetlands
Saline lakes of Western Australia

Arakel, A (1979) Quaternary sedimentation in Hutt and Leeman Lagoons, Western Australia, PhD Thesis, The University of Western Australia, Australia 

Arakel, A.V., 1980. Genesis and diagenesis of Holocene evaporitic sediments in Hutt and Leeman Lagoons, Western Australia:  Jour. Sedim. Petrology, v. 50, p. 1305-1326.

Arakel, A.V., 1981.  Geochemistry and hydrodynamics in Hutt and Leeman evaporitic Lagoons, Western Australia:  a comparitive study:  Marine Geology, v. 39, p. 1-28.

Arakel, A.V., 1982. Genesis of calcrete in Quaternary soil profiles of the Hutt and Leeman Lagoons, Western Australia: Jour. Sedim. Petrology, v. 52,  p.109-125.

Arakel, A.V., 1982.  A study of geochemistry and hydrodynamics in Hutt Lagoon:   In:  A Special Volume on ISCOL Proceedings. Oceanologica Acta, Special Volume, p. 9-19.

Arakel, A.V.  and T. Moulton, 1986. Hydro-geochemistry of surficial brines in Hutt Lagoon, Western Australia. Proceedings of SLEADS '84 Workshop, Palaeogeography, Palaeoclimatology, Palaeoecology, v. 54, p. 261-282.

Arakel A.V., 1986. Vadose diagenesis and multiple calcrete soil profile development in Hutt Lagoon area,  Western Australia. Revue de Geologie Dynamique et de Geographie Physique, v. 26, p. 243-254.